Anthony's nightjar (Nyctidromus anthonyi), also known as the scrub nightjar, is a species of nightjar in the family Caprimulgidae. It is found in Ecuador and Peru.

Taxonomy and systematics

Anthony's nightjar was originally described in genus Caprimulgus but DNA analysis and vocal differences show that it and its close relative the pauraque (Nyctidromus albicollis) require their own genus. For a time in the mid-1900s it was considered a subspecies of little nightjar (Setopagis parvula). Anthony's nightjar is monotypic.

Description

Males have grayish brown upperparts with buff speckles and blackish brown streaks; the crown is darker. They have a broad tawny buff collar on the nape. The tail feathers are mostly brown with considerable white on the outermost pair. The chin and upper throat are tawny buff with dark brown bars and speckles. The lower throat is white, the breast grayish brown with buff bars, and the belly and flanks buff with faint brown bars. In flight the five outermost primary wing feathers show a white or buffy stripe. The female is similar to the male but with less white on the wings and tail.

Distribution and habitat

Anthony's nightjar is found in coastal western Ecuador into northern Peru. It is generally sedentary but may make small movements in response to rains. It inhabits arid open woodlands, grasslands, and shrublands.

Behavior

Anthony's nightjar is active from dusk to dawn. It roosts on the ground during the day and is usually solitary.

Feeding

Though Anthony's nightjar is active throughout the night, it does most of its foraging at dusk and in early evening. It captures its insect prey in flight or by sallying from a branch. It tends to forage over open or semi-open areas.

Breeding

The breeding season of Anthony's nightjar has not been defined, though it appears to be concentrated between December and March and be tied to rainfall. It lays its single egg on the ground atop leaf litter.

Vocalization

Anthony's nightjar sings mostly at dusk and dawn. Its simple song is "a short treeow or keeLEEoo" sung from the ground or a low perch. It also makes a "rolling quaqrr" from a perch and "a soft tuk tuk tuk" flight call.

Status

The IUCN has assessed Anthony's nightjar as being of Least Concern. Its population is unknown but believed to be increasing, perhaps in response to the clearing of forest and dense scrub.

References

Anthony's nightjar
Birds of Ecuador
Birds of the Tumbes-Chocó-Magdalena
Anthony's nightjar
Taxonomy articles created by Polbot